Insurgency weapons and tactics are weapons and tactics, most often involving firearms or explosive devices, intended for use by insurgents to engage in guerrilla warfare against an occupier, or for use by rebels against an established government.  One type of insurgency weapon are "homemade" firearms made by non-professionals, such as the Błyskawica (Lightning) submachine gun  produced in underground workshops by the Polish resistance movement. Another weapon that is part of the conventional military arsenal, but which has been taken up to great effect by insurgents, is the RPG. Two examples of an improvised weapon used by insurgents would be the improvised explosive devices used in Iraq and the Molotov cocktails (glass bottles filled with gasoline) used against vehicles and tanks. Two tactics used by many insurgents are assassinations and suicide bomb attacks. The latter tactic is used when an insurgent has a bomb strapped to them or in their car, which provides a low-tech way for insurgents to get explosives close to critical enemy targets.

Purpose-designed weapons 
A fairly recent class of firearms, purpose-designed insurgency weapons first appeared during World War II, in the form of such arms as the FP-45 Liberator and the Sten submachine gun. Designed to be inexpensive, since they were to be airdropped or smuggled behind enemy lines, insurgency weapons were designed for use by guerrilla and insurgent groups. Most insurgency weapons are of simple design, typically made of sheet steel stampings, which are then folded into shape and welded. Tubular steel in standard sizes is also used when possible, and barrels (one of the few firearm parts that require fine tolerances and high strength) may be rifled (like the Sten) or left smoothbore (like the FP-45).

The CIA Deer gun of the 1960s was similar to the Liberator, but used an aluminum casting for the body of the pistol, and was chambered in 9×19 mm Parabellum, one of the all-time most common handgun cartridges in the world. There is no known explanation for the name "Deer Gun", but the Deer Gun was intended to be smuggled into Vietnam, attested by the instruction sheet printed in Vietnamese. It was produced by the American Machine & Foundry Co., but was a sanitized weapon, meaning it lacked any marking identifying manufacturer or user. Details of the manufacture of insurgency weapons are almost always deliberately obscured by the governments making them, as in the designation of the FP-45 pistol.

Other insurgency weapons may be sanitized versions of traditional infantry or defensive weapons. These may be purpose-made without markings, or they may be standard commercial or military arms that have been altered to remove the manufacturers markings. Due to the covert nature of insurgency weapons, documenting their history is often difficult. Those that can legally be traded on the civilian market, like the Liberator pistol, will often command high prices; although millions of the pistols were made, few survived the war.

These examples are all arms that were either used as insurgency weapons or designed for such use. Purpose-built weapons were designed from the start to be used primarily for insurgent use, and are fairly crude, very inexpensive, and simple to operate; many were packaged with instructions targeted to speakers of certain languages, or pictorial instructions usable by illiterate users or speakers of any language. Dual-use weapons are those that were designed with special allowances for use by insurgent troops. Sanitized weapons are any arms that have been manufactured or altered to remove markings that indicate the point of origin. IEDs are improvised explosive devices.

The FP-45 Liberator was a single-shot .45 ACP derringer-type pistol, made by the U.S. during World War II. It was made from stamped steel with an unrifled barrel. The designation "FP" stood for "flare projector", which was apparently an attempt to disguise the use of its intended purpose by obscuring the nature of the project. It was packed with ten rounds of ammunition and was intended to be used for assassinating enemy soldiers so that their weapons could then be captured and used by the insurgents. The instructions were pictorial, so that the gun could be distributed in any theatre of war, and used even by illiterate operators. The country in which the largest quantity was used was the Philippines.

The CIA Deer gun was a single-shot 9×19 mm Parabellum pistol, made by the U.S. during the Vietnam War. It was packaged with three rounds of ammunition in the grip and packed with instructions in a plastic box. If air-dropped into water, the plastic box containing the pistol would float. Like the earlier FP-45 Liberator, it was designed primarily for assassination of enemy soldiers, with the intention that it would be replaced by an enemy soldier's left-over equipment. The instructions for the Deer Gun were pictorial, with text in Vietnamese.

Although various submachine guns were manufactured in Northern Ireland with "Round Sections" (Round shaped receivers) and "Square Sections" (Square shaped receivers), the Avenger submachine gun which was used by Loyalist Paramilitaries was considered one of the best designs for its type. The bolts were telescoping with a forward recoil/return spring with in the rear, a heavy coil spring that acts as a buffer increasing accuracy and recoil handling. The barrels were usually found lacking rifling but this can in some cases possibly increase ballistics at close quarters. It used Sten magazines and had the capabilities of adapting suppressors.

During the 1970s–80s, International Ordnance Group of San Antonio, Texas released the MP2 machine pistol. It was intended as a more compact alternative to the British Sten gun (although in its components and overall design have nothing directly similar to the STEN), to be used in urban guerrilla actions, to be manufactured cheaply and/or in less-than-well-equipped workshops and distributed to "friendly" undercover forces. Much like the previously mentioned FP-45 "Liberator" pistol of World War 2, it could be discarded during an escape with no substantial loss for the force's arsenal. The MP2 is a blowback-operated weapon that fires from an open bolt with an extremely high rate of fire. A more common weapon of Guatemalan origin is the SM-9. Another example is the Métral submachine gun designed by Gerard Métral intended for manufacture during occupation and undercover circumstances.

A unique example is the Soviet S4M pistol, designed to be used expressly for the purpose of assassination. It was a simple break-open, two-shot derringer, but the unique features came from its specialized ammunition, designed around a cut-down version of the 7.62mm rounds used in the Soviet AK-47. The casings of the round contained a piston-like plunger between the bullet and the powder that would move forward inside the casing when fired. The piston would push the round down the barrel and plug the end of the casing, completely sealing off any explosive gases in the casing. This, combined with the inherently low-velocity round resulted in a truly silent pistol. The nature of the gun and ammunition led to it being wildly inaccurate outside of point-blank range. To add further confusion and throw possible suspicion away from the assassin, the barrel rifling was designed to affect the bullet in such a way that ballistics experts would not only conclude that the round was fired from an AK-47, but that the round was fired from several hundred feet away. Due to the politically devastating nature inherent in this design, the S4M was kept highly secret. Information on the pistol was not known by western governments until well after the end of the Cold War.

The Winchester Liberator is a 16-gauge, four-barrelled shotgun, similar to a scaled-up four-shot double-action derringer. It was an implementation of the Hillberg Insurgency Weapon design. Robert Hillberg, the designer, envisioned a weapon that was cheap to manufacture, easy to use, and provided a significant chance of being effective in the hands of someone who had never handled a firearm before. Pistols and submachine guns were eliminated from consideration due to the training required to use them effectively. The shotgun was chosen because it provided a high hit probability. Both Winchester and Colt built prototypes, although the Colt eight-shot design came late in the war and was adapted for the civilian law enforcement market. No known samples were ever produced for military use.

Dual-use weapons 

Some purpose-designed insurgency weapons were designed for a dual use–that is for use by both insurgents and conventional soldiers. The Welrod pistol was a simple, bolt-action pistol developed by the SOE for use in World War II. It was designed for supplying to foreign British-aligned insurgents and for use by covert British forces. The pistol was designed with an integral sound suppressor, and was ideal for killing sentries and other covert work; the bolt-operated action meant that cocking the gun produced almost no noise, and the bulky but efficient suppressor eliminated nearly all of the muzzle blast. Welrod pistols included a magazine that doubled as a hand-grip, and were originally produced with no markings save a serial number.

The Sten was a 9×19 mm Parabellum submachine gun manufactured by the United Kingdom in World War II. Although not designed as an insurgency weapon, it was designed at a time when Britain had a dire need for weapons and was designed to be easily produced in basic machine shops and use a readily available round, it was therefore the ideal weapon to be produced by resistance groups in occupied territories. Towards the end of the war, the German were in need of weapons and they produced both a version of the Sten, the MP 3008,  to arm the Volkssturm and near identical copies of the Sten down to makers marks to arm the Werwolf insurgency force.

Other insurgency weapons

Soviet Bloc weaponry 
Due to the massive exportation of weaponry by the Soviet Union and the Eastern Bloc to communist governments and insurgencies in foreign countries, as well as the production of Soviet-made weaponry by many militaries around the world, Soviet-made weapons and their copies are widely available, being present in most Third World countries throughout Asia, Africa and the Middle East. Of particular notability is the AK-47 assault rifle and its AKM variant which have seen service in almost every conflict since the Korean War in the militaries of Third World countries and insurgent groups due to its wide availability, simplicity, reliability, durability and ease of use, however they are just two of countless other types of Soviet World War II-era weapons, such as the TT pistol, Mosin–Nagant bolt-action rifle, PPSh-41 submachine gun, RPD and SG-43 Goryunov medium machine guns and DShK heavy machine gun, and Cold War-era weapons such as the AK-74 assault  rifle, RPK light machine gun, PK general-purpose machine gun, SVD-63 Dragunov sniper rifle and RPG-2 and RPG-7 rocket launchers

The first large-scale usage by an insurgency of the Kalashnikov series weapons was during the Vietnam War, when massive numbers of Soviet, Chinese and Eastern Bloc-produced AKs and RPKs, along with limited numbers of PKs and SVD-63s, were provided by communist countries to North Vietnam, which supplied them to the South Vietnamese Viet Cong, Laotian Pathet Lao and Cambodian Khmer Rouge. Due to the massive numbers of weapons that were supplied, they became the primary weapons of these groups and of the North Vietnamese army, replacing World War II-era French and Soviet-produced bolt-action rifles and submachine guns and supplanting weapons captured from U.S and South Vietnamese forces.

Captured enemy weapons 
Insurgencies have long made use of weapons stolen, captured or otherwise procured from enemy forces due to the ease of procuring them and their ammunition, something that is very important to an insurgency which will be poorly equipped and will need whatever weaponry it can get. Such weapons are typically acquired by either looting them from enemy soldiers that they have defeated, by having infiltrators and sympathisers in the enemy forces steal munitions and secretly supply it to them, by gathering munitions abandoned by retreating, advancing or neglectful enemy soldiers, or by purchasing munitions sold by enemy soldiers on the black market.

During World War II, firearms captured from the Axis powers were used extensively by resistance movements in Europe and the Pacific, due to their availability. These weapons were used alongside weapons supplied by the Allies and weapons inherited from their countries’ previous militaries. Methods of acquiring weapons included purchasing them on the black market from Axis soldiers or their allies or stealing from German supply depots or transports. Special efforts were also made to capture weapons from the Axis, such as raids were conducted on trains and vehicles carrying equipment to the front, as well as on guardhouses and gendarmerie posts, that proved highly successful. Sometimes weapons were taken from individual Axis soldiers accosted in streets or were brought over by defecting Axis collaborators. During the Warsaw Uprising, the Polish Armia Krajowa (AK, Home Army) even managed to capture several German armored vehicles, most notably a Jagdpanzer 38 Hetzer light tank destroyer renamed “Chwat” and an Sd.Kfz. 251 armoured personnel carrier renamed “Grey Wolf”. Captured German weapons used by European resistance groups included the Karabiner 98k bolt-action rifle and MP 40 submachine gun, while resistance groups in the Pacific used captured Japanese weapons such as the Nambu pistol and Arisaka bolt-action rifle.

During the First Indochina War, the Indochinese Viet Minh used weapons abandoned by or captured from the Japanese during WWII, but also made use of weapons captured from the French and their French Indochina administration, such as the MAS-36 and MAS-49 rifles, MAT-49 submachine gun and the FM 24/29, Reibel, Vickers and Hotchkiss M1914, M1922 and M1929 machine guns.

Japanese and French weapons continued to see service with the Liberation Army of South Vietnam of the Viet Cong during the Vietnam War, with regular units using them during the early stages of the war, before they were passed down to militia units. They also used U.S-made weapons captured from the South Vietnamese Army of the Republic of Vietnam, such as M1911 pistols, Thompson and M3 submachine guns, M1 Garand rifles, M1 and M2 carbines and M1918 BAR and M1919 Browning machine guns, which they either captured in ambushes or raids or purchased off of the black market, the latter case being made possible by corrupt ARVN military officers illegally selling munitions for profit. Later in the war following the U.S intervention, more modern U.S weapons such as M14 and M16 rifles, M60 and M2 Browning machine guns and M79 grenade launchers were captured from U.S forces and the increasingly modernised ARVN.

Homemade or improvised firearms

The Błyskawica (Lightning) was a simple submachine gun  produced by the Armia Krajowa, or Home Army, a Polish resistance movement fighting the Germans in occupied Poland. It was produced in underground workshops. Its main feature was its simplicity, so that the weapon could be made even in small workshops, by inexperienced engineers. It used threaded pipes for simplicity.

In some cases, guerrillas have used improvised, repurposed firearms. One example is described by Che Guevara in his book Guerrilla Warfare. Called the "M-16", it consists of a 16 gauge sawed-off shotgun provided with a bipod to hold the barrel at a 45-degree angle.  This was loaded with a blank cartridge formed by removing the shot from a standard shot shell, followed by a wooden rod with a Molotov cocktail attached to the front.  This formed an improvised mortar capable of firing the incendiary device accurately out to a range of 100 meters.

Flare guns have also been converted to firearms.  This may be accomplished by replacing the (often plastic) barrel of the flare gun with a metal pipe strong enough to chamber a shotgun shell, or by inserting a smaller bore barrel into the existing barrel (such as with a caliber conversion sleeve) to chamber a firearm cartridge, such as a .22 Long Rifle.

Sanitised arms 
The Yugoslavian Zastava M48BO (for bez oznake, 'without markings') rifle was manufactured with no markings save for a serial number. These were made in Yugoslavia for delivery to Egypt prior to the Suez Crisis of 1956. Yugoslavia was technically a neutral country, and by sanitizing the rifles sold to the Egyptians, it hoped to distance itself from the conflict between Egypt and Israel. Only a few hundred of the few thousand made were delivered to Egypt, the rest remaining in storage in Yugoslavia until recently rediscovered. They are currently being sold to civilian collectors.

Plausible deniability 
In the present day plausible deniability allows the supply of arms by governments to insurgents without the need for over elaborate ruses. For example, the sheer number of AKM (an upgraded version of the AK-47 rifle) manufacturers and users in the world means that governments can supply these weapons to insurgents with plausible deniability as to exactly from where and from whom the guns were acquired.

Improvised explosive devices

An improvised explosive device (IED), also known as a roadside bomb, is a homemade bomb constructed and deployed in ways other than in conventional military action. It may be constructed of conventional military explosives, such as an artillery round, attached to a detonating mechanism.

IEDs may be used in terrorist actions or in unconventional warfare by guerrillas or commando forces in a theater of operations. In the second Iraq War, IEDs were used extensively against US-led Coalition forces and by the end of 2007 they had become responsible for approximately 63% of Coalition deaths in Iraq. They were also used in Afghanistan by insurgent groups, and caused over 66% of the Coalition casualties in the 2001–2021 Afghanistan War.

Throughout The Troubles, the Provisional IRA made extensive use of remote control IEDs against the British security forces. Initially, bombs were detonated either by timer or by simple command wire, but later in the conflict, bombs could be detonated by radio control; simple servos from radio-controlled aircraft were used to close the electrical circuit and supply power to the detonator. Roadside bombs were also extensively used; they were typically placed in a drain or culvert along a rural road and detonated by remote control when British security forces vehicles were passing.  The IRA also used secondary devices to attack British reinforcements sent in after an initial blast as occurred in the Warrenpoint Ambush. IRA bombs became highly sophisticated, featuring anti-handling devices such as a mercury tilt switch or microswitches. These devices would detonate the bomb if it was moved in any way. Typically, the safety-arming device used was a clockwork Memopark timer, which armed the bomb up to 60 minutes after it was placed by completing an electrical circuit supplying power to the anti-handling device. Depending on the particular design, an independent electrical circuit supplied power to a conventional timer set for the intended time delay, e.g. 40 minutes. However, some electronic delays developed by IRA technicians could be set to accurately detonate a bomb weeks after it was hidden. After the British developed jammers, IRA technicians also developed devices that required a sequence of pulsed radio codes to arm and detonate them that were harder to jam.

Starting six months before the invasion of Afghanistan by the USSR on 27 December 1979, the Afghan Mujahideen were supplied by the CIA, among others, with large quantities of many different types of anti-tank mines. The insurgents often removed the explosives from several anti-tank mines and combined the explosives in tin cooking-oil cans for a more powerful blast. By combining the explosives from several mines and placing them in tin cans, the insurgents made them more powerful, but sometimes also easier to detect by Soviet sappers using mine detectors. After an IED was detonated, the insurgents often used direct-fire weapons such as machine guns and rocket-propelled grenades to continue the attack.

Afghan insurgents operating far from the border with Pakistan did not have a ready supply of foreign anti-tank mines. They preferred to make IEDs from Soviet unexploded ordnance. The devices were rarely triggered by pressure fuses. They were almost always remotely detonated. Since the 2001 invasion of Afghanistan, the Taliban and its supporters have used IEDs against NATO and Afghan military and civilian vehicles. This has become the most common method of attack against NATO forces, with IED attacks increasing consistently year on year; according to a report by the Homeland Security Market Research in the US, the number of IEDs used in Afghanistan had increased by 400 percent since 2007 and the number of troops killed by them by 400 percent, and those wounded by 700 percent. It has been reported that IEDs are the number one cause of death among NATO troops in Afghanistan. 

Beginning in July 2003, the Iraqi insurgency used IEDs to target invading coalition vehicles. Many of these IEDs were made from military explosives looted from munitions bunkers following the 2003 invasion, such as landmines stripped of their explosives, 155-millimetre artillery shells rigged with blasting caps and modified aviation bombs of 500 lb or more, detonated by systems such as pull-wires and mechanical detonators, cell-phones, garage-door openers, cables, radio control (RC), and infrared lasers among others. To counter increasing armor protection, the insurgents have also developed IEDs that make use of explosively formed projectiles (EFPs); these are essentially cylindrical shaped charges usually constructed with a machined concave metal disc (often copper) facing the target, pointed inward. The force of the shaped charge turns the disc into a high velocity slug, capable of penetrating the armor of most enemy vehicles. Commonly positions for IEDs include on utility poles, road signs or trees, buried underground or in piles of garbage, disguised as rocks or bricks, and even inside dead animals. Typically they explode underneath or to the side of the vehicle, however, IEDs in elevated positions such as on road signs are able hit less protected areas. It has been estimated by the Washington Post that as much as 64% of U.S. deaths in Iraq occurred due to IEDs.

IEDs have also been used extensively by other groups, such as Maoists in India, ISIL in Syria and across the world, and by the Liberation Tigers of Tamil Eelam (LTTE) in Sri Lanka.

Land mines
Land mines have been used extensively by insurgents throughout Cold War and post-Cold War conflicts such as the First Indochina War, Vietnam War, South African Border War and conflicts in Iraq, Syria and Yemen by insurgents as a method of area denial, psychological warfare and attrition. During such conflicts, minefields are never marked and are used for more than defensive purposes, and are also placed singly over a less wide area.

Land mines were commonly deployed by insurgents during the South African Border War, leading directly to the development of the first dedicated mine-protected armoured vehicles in South Africa. Namibian insurgents used anti-tank mines to throw South African military convoys into disarray before attacking them. In the areas of fighting that covered vast sparsely populated areas of southern Angola and northern Namibia, it was easy for small groups to infiltrate and lay their mines on roads before escaping again often undetected. The anti-tank mines were most often placed on public roads used by civilian and military vehicles and had a great psychological effect. Mines were often laid in complex arrangements. One tactic was to lay multiple mines on top of each other to increase the blast effect. Another common tactic was to link together several mines placed within a few metres of each other, so that all would detonate when any one was triggered.  To discourage detection and removal efforts, they also laid anti-personnel mines directly parallel to the anti-tank mines. This initially resulted in heavy South African military and police casualties, as the vast distances of road network vulnerable to insurgent sappers every day made comprehensive detection and clearance efforts impractical. The only other viable option was the adoption of mine-protected vehicles which could remain mobile on the roads with little risk to their passengers even if a mine was detonated. South Africa is widely credited with inventing the v-hull, a vee-shaped hull for armoured vehicles which deflects mine blasts away from the passenger compartment.

During the Iraqi, Syrian and Yemeni civil wars, landmines have been used for both defensive and guerrilla purposes. Anti-tank mines were also used extensively in Cambodia and along the Thai border, planted by Pol Pot's Maoist guerrillas and the Vietnamese army, which invaded Cambodia in 1979 to topple the Khmer Rouge. Millions of these mines remain in the area, despite clearing efforts. It is estimated that they cause hundreds of deaths annually to civilians.

Rocket-propelled grenades

Rocket-propelled grenades (RPGs) were used extensively during the Vietnam War (by the Vietnam People's Army and Viet Cong), Soviet invasion of Afghanistan by the Mujahideen and against South Africans in Angola and Namibia (formerly South West Africa) by SWAPO guerrillas during what the South Africans called the South African Border War. Twenty years later, they are still being used widely in recent conflict areas such as Chechnya, Iraq, and Sri Lanka.

The RPG still remains a potent threat to armored vehicles, especially in situations such as urban warfare or jungle warfare, where they are favored by guerrillas. They are most effective when used in restricted terrain as the availability of cover and concealment can make it difficult for the intended target to spot the RPG operator. Note that this concealment is often preferably outdoors, because firing an RPG within an enclosed area may create a dangerous backblast.

In Afghanistan, Mujahideen guerrilla fighters used RPG-7s to destroy Soviet vehicles. To assure a kill, two to four RPG shooters would be assigned to each vehicle. Each armored-vehicle hunter-killer team could have had as many as 15 RPGs per unit. In areas where vehicles were confined to a single path (a mountain road, swamps, snow, urban areas), RPG teams trapped convoys by destroying the first and last vehicles in line, preventing movement of the other vehicles. This tactic was especially effective in cities. Convoys learned to avoid approaches with overhangs and to send infantrymen forward in hazardous areas to detect the RPG teams. Multiple shooters were also effective against heavy tanks with reactive armor: The first shot would be against the driver's viewing prisms. Following shots would be in pairs, one to set off the reactive armor, the second to penetrate the tank's armor. Favored weak spots were the top and rear of the turret. 

The Mujahideen sometimes used RPG-7s at extreme range, exploded by their 4.5-second self-destruct timer, which translates to roughly 950m flight distance, as a method of long distance approach denial for enemy infantry and reconnaissance.  

In the period following the 2003 invasion of Iraq, the RPG became a favorite weapon of the insurgent forces fighting U.S. troops. Since most of the readily available RPG-7 rounds cannot penetrate M1 Abrams tank armor from almost any angle, it is primarily effective against soft-skinned or lightly armored vehicles, and infantry. Even if the RPG hit does not completely disable the tank or kill the crew, it can still damage external equipment, lowering the tank's effectiveness or forcing the crew to abandon and destroy it. Newer RPG-7 rounds are more capable, and in August 2006, an RPG-29 round penetrated the frontal ERA of a Challenger 2 tank during an engagement in al-Amarah, Iraq, and wounded several crew members.

During the South African Border War, the Soviet RPGs used by SWAPO guerrillas and their Angolan supporters posed a serious threat to South Africa's lightly armored APCs, which could be easily targeted as soon as they stopped to disembark troops.  During the First (1994–1996) and Second Chechen Wars (1999–2009), Chechen rebels used RPGs to attack Russian tanks from basements and high rooftops. This tactic was effective because tank main guns could not be depressed or raised far enough to return fire, in addition, armor on the very top and bottom of tanks was usually the weakest. Russian forces had to rely on artillery suppression, good crew gunners and infantry screens to prevent such attacks. Tank columns were eventually protected by attached self-propelled anti-aircraft guns (ZSU-23-4 Shilka, 9K22 Tunguska) used in the ground role to suppress and destroy Chechen ambushes. Chechen fighters formed independent "cells" that worked together to destroy a specific Russian armored target. Each cell contained small arms and some form of RPG (RPG-7V or RPG-18, for example). The small arms were used to button the tank up and keep any infantry occupied, while the RPG gunner struck at the tank. While doing so, other teams would attempt to fire at the target in order to overwhelm the Russians' ability to effectively counter the attack. To further increase the chance of success, the teams took up positions at different elevations where possible. Firing from the third and higher floors allowed good shots at the weakest armor (the top). When the Russians began moving in tanks fitted with explosive reactive armor (ERA), the Chechens had to adapt their tactics, because the RPGs they had access to were unlikely to result in the destruction of the tank.

Using RPGs as improvised anti-aircraft batteries has proved successful in Somalia, Afghanistan and Chechnya. Helicopters are typically ambushed as they land, take off or hover. In Afghanistan, the Mujahideen often modified RPGs for use against Soviet helicopters by adding a curved pipe to the rear of the launcher tube, which diverted the backblast, allowing the RPG to be fired upward at aircraft from a prone position. This made the operator less visible prior to firing and decreased the risk of injury from hot exhaust gases. The Mujahideen also utilized the 4.5-second timer on RPG rounds to make the weapon function as part of a flak battery, using multiple launchers to increase hit probabilities. At the time, Soviet helicopters countered the threat from RPGs at landing zones by first clearing them with anti-personnel saturation fire. The Soviets also varied the number of accompanying helicopters (two or three) in an effort to upset Afghan force estimations and preparation. In response, the Mujahideen prepared dug-in firing positions with top cover, and again, Soviet forces altered their tactics by using air-dropped thermobaric fuel-air bombs on such landing zones. As the U.S.-supplied Stinger surface-to-air missiles became available to them, the Afghans abandoned RPG attacks as the smart missiles proved especially efficient in the destruction of unarmed Soviet transport helicopters, such as Mil Mi-17. In Somalia, both of the UH-60 Black Hawk helicopters lost by U.S. forces during the Battle of Mogadishu in 1993 were downed by RPG-7s.

Molotov cocktail
The Molotov cocktail is a generic name used for a variety of improvised incendiary weapons. Due to the relative ease of production, they are frequently used by amateur protesters and non-professionally equipped fighters in urban guerrilla warfares. They are primarily intended to set targets ablaze rather than instantly destroy them. A Molotov cocktail is a breakable glass bottle containing a flammable substance such as gasoline/petrol or a napalm-like mixture, with some motor oil added, and usually a source of ignition such as a burning cloth wick held in place by the bottle's stopper. The wick is usually soaked in alcohol or kerosene, rather than gasoline.

Improvised artillery 

Improvised and homemade mortars, howitzers and rocket launchers have been used by insurgent groups to attack fortified military installations or to terrorize civilians. They are usually constructed by in a variety of different ways, for example, from heavy steel piping mounted on a steel frame. These weapons may fire factory-made or improvised rounds, and can contain many different explosive fillers and firing mechanisms. 

“Barrack buster” is the colloquial name given to several improvised mortars developed in the 1990s by the Provisional Irish Republican Army (PIRA) during The Troubles. There was several different versions of these mortars constructed by the PIRA, with the most commonly used being the Mark 15 320mm mortar, which fired a projectile constructed of a gas cylinder filled with 196-220 pounds        (89-100 kg) of homemade explosives which was remarked as having the effect of a “flying                 car bomb”, and was used in several different attacks on British Army and RUC bases. It was also used in attacks on a number of British helicopters, two of which were successfully shot down in 1994; a British Army Westland Lynx multipurpose helicopter, and an RAF Aérospatiale SA 330 Puma transport helicopter. Several other types of improvised mortars were created by the PIRA during the Troubles, including the “Mark 16” or “Projected Recoilless Improvised Grenade”, which was used more like a rocket launcher and fired a projectile made of a tin can filled with 600g of Semtex, the “Mark 12” or “Improvised Propelled Grenade” which fired a 40 ounce (1.1 kg) warhead horizontally at security forces bases and vehicles, and the “Mark 10”, which fired a 44–220 pound (20–100 kg) warhead, one of which was responsible for the first intentional killing of a British soldier in a mortar attack. Because of the weight of these mortars, they often had to be transported on vehicles such as tractors and vans.

Improvised artillery has been used extensively by various factions of the Syrian opposition during the Syrian civil war as a way of making up for deficits in the quantity of military-grade artillery. These “Hell Cannons”, as they are known, have been used by various anti-government and Jihadist groups and can fire both improvised and factory-made rounds. The first of these weapons were made in 2012 by the Islamist Ahrar al-Shamal Brigade in the Idlib Governorate around the city of Binnish before the manufacturing was moved to Aleppo by the Free Syrian Army’s 16th Division which also appropriated the design. The knowledge spread to other groups in Syria, including the Islamic State of Iraq and the Levant. Variants of these cannons have also been developed by rebel forces, including the “Thunder Cannon” made from the body of a 100mm tank gun round, the “Mortar Cannon” made by the FSA’s 16th Division that fires factory-made rounds, a compressed air cannon made by Ahrar al-Sham, the “Hellfire Cannon” and a number of multi-barrelled cannons such as the 4-barrelled “Quad Hell Cannon” and the 7-barrelled “Bureji” which is named after a Palestinian refugee camp in Gaza.

Insurgency tactics

Agents and sympathizers in place
Insurgent organizations may recruit members of the government's civil and security forces to their cause or to have their own members join them. In addition to being able to provide intelligence and possibly provide direct and indirect aid, doing so allows insurgent members to gain military training and skills which they would not otherwise be able to access, these members may then serve as a cadre to train other insurgents, those who rise high enough may become agents of influence.

Agitation
Often grouped together with propaganda as agitprop, agitation is the use of agitators to stir up discontent both real and imagined with the regime and to propose a course of action to right these perceived wrongs. The traditional targets of agitators have been the shop floor, students' unions and the junior officer's mess halls of the military.

Ambushes 
Ambushes have been used for as long as guerrilla warfare has been a tactic, and many guerrilla and insurgent groups have used ambushes as a way of defeating superior enemy forces with minimal risk to the insurgents. The ability of an insurgent force to launch an ambush against unsuspecting enemy forces and then withdraw in order to avoid engaging superior enemy reinforcements, or as a tactic of attrition to gradually wear down enemy forces by inflicting casualties and damaging morale, with minimal risk to the insurgents, makes ambushes a very useful tactic for guerrilla and insurgent forces.

Guerrilla warfare was the primary tactic of the Viet Cong and North Vietnamese army when fighting against the United States and South Vietnam during the Vietnam War, as the thick jungle and rural farmland provided ideal cover for such activities. Ambushes were the most common tactic, with several different types. The terrain for the ambush had to meet strict criteria, allowing for the provision of concealment from both ground or air, to allow the ambush force to deploy, encircle and divide the enemy, the positioning of heavy weapons emplacements in kill zones to provide sustained fire, to enable the ambush force to set up observation posts for detection of the enemy, and to permit the concealed movement of troops to the ambush position and the dispersal of troops during withdrawal. One important feature of the ambush was that the target units should 'pile up' after being attacked, thus preventing them any easy means of withdrawal from the kill zone and hindering their use of heavy weapons and supporting airstrikes and artillery fire. Terrain was usually selected which would facilitate this and slow down the enemy. The terrain around the ambush site which was not favorable to the ambushing force, or which offered some protection to the target, was heavily mined and booby trapped or pre-registered for mortars.

Iraqi insurgents frequently launched ambushes of Coalition and Iraqi military convoys and patrols during the Iraq War, using numerous types of weapons such as small arms, rocket-propelled grenades, snipers, improvised explosive devices and car bombs. Soft-skinned vehicles such as Humvees were the most commonly targeted. The congested and constricted terrain of the urban areas, and in the rural areas, palm groves and other crops, offered idea cover and concealment for insurgents launching ambushes. The Shia Islamic insurgent group known as the Mahdi Army was one of the primary users of ambush tactics, but ambushes were also used by the Jihadist groups Al-Qaeda in Iraq and Jamaat Ansar al-Sunna. Attacks were usually broken off before support could be called in, in traditional guerrilla fashion. Direct ambushes of U.S. forces declined in the later stages of the war, however, to avoid insurgent casualties as U.S. defences and tactics improved. Ambushes against the poorly equipped and experienced Iraqi security forces, however, proved very lethal. Most Mahdi Army ambushes prior to April 5, 2004 involved no more than seven ambushers with kill zones no larger than 100 meters, however after that night, kill zones became much larger (some several hundred meters long) with many more attackers. There were occasional isolated cases of larger ambushes, such as an attack on a coalition convoy in Samarra on November 30, 2003 that involved 100 fighters and a massive ambush of a coalition convoy in Sadr City on April 4, 2004 by over 1,000 Mahdi Army militiamen.

Assassinations
Insurgent groups have often employed assassination as a tool to further their causes. Assassinations provide several functions for such groups, namely the removal of specific enemies and as propaganda tools to focus the attention of media and politics on their cause.

The Irish Republican Army guerrillas of 1919–21 killed many RIC Police Intelligence officers during the Irish War of Independence. Michael Collins set up a special unit – the Squad – for this purpose, which had the effect of intimidating many policemen into resigning from the force. The Squad's activities peaked with the killing of 14 British agents in Dublin on Bloody Sunday in 1920.

This tactic was used again by the Provisional IRA during the Troubles in Northern Ireland (1969–1998). Killing of RUC officers and assassination of RUC politicians was one of a number of methods used in the Provisional IRA campaign 1969–1997. The IRA also attempted to assassinate British Prime Minister Margaret Thatcher by bombing the Conservative Party Conference in a Brighton hotel. Loyalist paramilitaries retaliated by killing Catholics at random and assassinating Irish nationalist politicians.

Basque terrorists ETA in Spain have assassinated many security and political figures since the late 1960s, notably Luis Carrero Blanco, 1st Duke of Carrero-Blanco Grandee of Spain, in 1973. Since the early 1990s, they have also targeted academics, journalists and local politicians who publicly disagreed with them.

The Red Brigades in Italy carried out assassinations of political figures, as to a lesser extent, did the Red Army Faction in Germany in the 1970s and 1980s.

In the Vietnam War, Communist insurgents routinely assassinated government officials and individual civilians deemed to offend or rival the revolutionary movement. Such attacks, along with widespread military activity by insurgent bands, almost brought the Diem regime to collapse before the U.S. intervention.

Bank robberies
Bank robberies have been used by insurgents and revolutionaries in order to fund their activities, for example the 1907 Tiflis bank robbery, using violence in excess of that needed to achieve the aims of the robberies helps contributes to a climate of fear.

Group participation in atrocities
As an initiation new recruits, especially forced ones, will be encouraged or forced to participate in atrocities, such as torture, rape and murder, unwilling recruits will be forced to do this against their own communities and families or be killed themselves. The goal of these atrocities is to divorce the new recruit from his or her previous life and bind them to the insurgency; criminals in their own eyes and in the eyes of society, such recruits will be led to believe that they cannot go back to their previous lives and have no other family other than the insurgency. In order to break the hold the insurgency may hold over such members, the authorities may offer amnesties and pardons for crimes committed.

Kidnapping
Insurgents kidnap and take hostage members of the general public or military for purposes such as the provision of funding or the release of prisoners. The kidnapping of family members may be used to coerce co-operation, the provision of information, use of a property as a safe house, a copy of a key etc. High value hostages may be taken in order to force the release of captured comrades and as media spectaculars. At all levels creating a fear of kidnapping reinforces a message that the state and its security forces cannot provide protection. Members of the military have also been kidnapped for propaganda purposes, or to hold them hostage in order to receive supplies and funding, or the release of insurgent prisoners.

Kidnappings emerged as another tactic of the Iraqi insurgency in April 2004, as a way of intimidating foreign civilians, acquiring the payment of a ransom or the release of captured insurgents, and as a propaganda technique of attracting media attention and inspiring recruits. Foreign civilians bore the brunt of the kidnappings, although U.S. military personnel were also been targeted, as was the case with Ahmed Kousay al-Taie. After kidnapping the victim, the insurgents typically made some sort of demand of the government of the hostage's nation and give a time limit for the demand to be carried out, often 72 hours. Execution is often threatened if the government fails to heed the wishes of the hostage takers. Several individuals, including American radio tower repairman Nick Berg and South Korean Christian missionary Kim Sun-il, among others, have been beheaded. In many cases, tapes of the beheadings are distributed for propaganda purposes. However, 80% of hostages taken by insurgents have been peacefully released. Jill Carroll, a journalist for the Christian Science Monitor, was kidnapped in early 2006, and although later let go, her Iraqi interpreter was killed. Almost all of the kidnappings were conducted by radical Sunni groups on the fringe of the insurgency.

During the Israeli–Palestinian conflict, kidnapping of Israeli soldiers and civilians has been employed by Palestinian nationalists for years, who have integrated kidnapping into their guerrilla warfare-style tactics. Numerous members of the Israel Defense Forces have been kidnapped by militants such as Hamas or Hezbollah, who demand the release of Palestinian militants from Israeli jails and the funding and supply of the insurgents as part of a ransom. Several of these Israeli soldiers who have been kidnapped have died in captivity from poor conditions or other causes. One of the most notable examples of Palestinian kidnapping is that of the 2006 Gaza cross-border raid, where IDF Sergeant first class Gilad Shalit was wounded and captured by members of the Izz ad-Din al-Qassam Brigades (the military wing of Hamas), Popular Resistance Committees and the Army of Islam, who abducted him through tunnels dug under the Gaza Strip. A cross-border raid in 2006 by Hezbollah also succeeded in kidnapping IDF soldiers Ehud Goldwasser and Eldad Regev, but these two later died of injuries sustained during the battle. In 1982, IDF tank commander Hezi Shai was also kidnapped by members of the Popular Front for the Liberation of Palestine-General Command, and held captive until the Jibril Agreement in 1985.

Law and order
Insurgents may attempt to create a parallel system of  "justice" with punishment beatings and killings of criminals in order to ingratiate themselves with the populace. Especially in corrupt and failed regimes where there is a deficit of true justice people's and revolutionary courts aim to legitimize the insurgents as a government in waiting. This is doubly so if insurgents are seen as bringing order in failed regimes, ones with weak central control, and ones in which the security forces are as bad as would be thieves and bandits.

Propaganda
Propaganda is used to sell to the populace the legitimacy, morality and ability of the insurgents, whilst at the same time portraying the government and its security forces in a negative light. This propaganda can be of the deed, spectacular acts of assassination, sabotage and violence, relying on the mass media to spread the insurgents message. If the state seeks to starve the insurgents of the "oxygen of publicity" the older means of disseminating the insurgents message is by pamphletting (e.g. Thomas Paine's Common Sense) and through use of the oral tradition of stories, rebel and revolutionary songs. Modern insurgents use the internet.

Sabotage
Sabotage against infrastructure, for example power stations, airports and reservoirs at the upper end, and for example electricity pylons, substations, telephone exchanges and railway tracks at the lower end make real to the populace that an insurgency is underway; and if sustained can affect the quality of life of the populace. In order to protect all the possible targets that the insurgents may attack, government forces may be stretched to the point where they become vulnerable to a defeat in detail.

Sabotage was used extensively by resistance movements during the Second World War as a way of aiding the Allies by attacking Axis supply lines in occupied territories in Nazi-occupied Europe and the Japanese-occupied Pacific. An example of this was the sabotage of infrastructure by the Polish Armia Krajowa, which commanded the majority of resistance organizations in Poland and coordinated and aided the Jewish Military Union as well as more reluctantly helping the Jewish Combat Organization, which was responsible for the greatest number of acts of sabotage in German-occupied Europe. The Home Army's sabotage operations Operation Garland and Operation Ribbon are just two examples. In all, the Home Army damaged 6,930 locomotives, set 443 rail transports on fire, damaged over 19,000 rail cars "wagony", and blew up 38 rail bridges, not to mention the attacks against the railroads. The Home Army was also responsible for 4,710 built-in flaws in parts for aircraft engines and 92,000 built-in flaws in artillery projectiles, among other examples of significant sabotage. In addition, over 25,000 acts of more minor sabotage were committed. Communist groups, such as the Armia Ludowa and Gwardia Ludowa, often caused casualties among German soldiers and civilians and their Polish collaborators, resulting in a great number of Polish and Jewish hostages, mostly civilians, being murdered in reprisal by the Germans. The Gwardia Ludowa destroyed around 200 German trains during the war, and indiscriminately threw hand grenades into places frequented by Germans. The French Resistance also ran an extremely effective sabotage campaign against the Germans. Receiving their sabotage orders through messages over the BBC radio or by aircraft, the French used both passive and active forms of sabotage. Passive forms included losing German shipments and allowing poor quality material to pass factory inspections. Many active sabotage attempts were against critical rail lines of transportation. German records count 1,429 instances of sabotage from French Resistance forces between January 1942 and February 1943. From January through March 1944, sabotage accounted for three times the number of locomotives damaged by Allied air power. 

From 1948 to 1960 during the Malayan Emergency, the armed branch of the Malayan Communist Party, the Malayan National Liberation Army committed numerous effective acts of sabotage against the British colonial authorities. Most of their efforts were centered around crippling Malaya's colonial economy and involved sabotage against trains, railway bridges, rubber trees, water pipes, electric lines and military camps. Although highly successful, they caused backlash among the Malayan population, who gradually withdrew support for the Communist movement as their livelihoods became threatened.

During the Vietnam War, the Liberation Army of South Vietnam used “swimmer saboteurs”, specially trained frogmen, to destroy or damage naval assets of the U.S and it’s allies. Between 1969 and 1970, swimmer saboteurs sunk, destroyed, or damaged 77 allied assets. Although poorly equipped, they were well-trained and resourceful. The swimmers provided a low-cost/low-risk option with high payoff; possible loss to the country for failure compared to the possible gains from a successful mission led to the conclusion that the swimmer saboteurs were a good idea.

During the Soviet–Afghan War, the Afghan mujahideen favoured sabotage operations. They concentrated on both civilian and military targets, such as cutting power lines, knocking out pipelines and radio stations, blowing bridges, closing major roads, attacking convoys, disrupting the electric power system and industrial production, bombing government office buildings, air terminals, hotels and cinemas, and attacking police stations and Soviet military installations and air bases. They assassinated government officials and People's Democratic Party of Afghanistan members, and laid siege to small rural outposts. In the border region with Pakistan, the Mujahideen would often launch 800 rockets per day. They also used land mines heavily. Often, they would enlist the services of local inhabitants, even children. In March 1982, a bomb exploded at the Ministry of Education, damaging several buildings. In the same month, a widespread power failure darkened Kabul when a pylon on the transmission line from the Naghlu power station was blown up. In June 1982 a column of about 1,000 young PDPA members sent out to work in the Panjshir valley were ambushed within 30 km of Kabul, with heavy loss of life. On 4 September 1985, insurgents shot down a domestic Bakhtar Airlines plane as it took off from Kandahar airport, killing all 52 people aboard.

During the Contras insurgency following the Nicaraguan Revolution, the Central Intelligence Agency developed The Freedom Fighter's Manual, a fifteen-page propaganda booklet that was airdropped over Nicaragua in 1983, which explained numerous sabotage methods by which the average citizen could cause civil disorder and disruption. Methods mentioned include destroying utility poles, blocking and destroying highways and being unproductive at work. The Contras also contributed to the sabotage campaign by attacking civilian targets such as healthcare clinics, schools and cooperatives, and industrial targets such as mining ports, pipelines and refineries. Civil servants such as doctors, nurses, judges and Sandinista National Liberation Front officials were also killed as part of the campaign.

Sniper attacks 
Snipers have historically been used by insurgents as a method of psychological warfare and attrition in Iraq, Syria, Yemen, Vietnam and Northern Ireland, including mobile units transported in vehicles. The highly urban areas of the Yemeni and Syrian civil wars and the Iraqi insurgencies and the rural areas of the Vietnam War and The Troubles provide ideal cover and positions for insurgent snipers, who kill or injure soldiers whenever possible and melt away to avoid enemy reinforcements and counterattacks.

Insurgents in Iraq have used snipers, including vehicle-borne units, to isolate enemy combatants from larger forces and strike at officers and commander—a demonstration of their technological capabilities and tactical patience.  They generally engage targets from 100 to 1000 meters and primarily use the SVD sniper rifle, however they have also been known to use .50 Cal and captured coalition M24 sniper rifles. Although an insurgent sniper unit usually operates from a dominant terrain feature, they have also seen shown to use cars and vans resourcefully to quickly move from position to position. The sniper or snipers usually films the shot, extracts, and then posts the very graphic and shocking event to the internet for propaganda purposes, focusing on lucrative targets that will earn them a lot of media attention.

Suicide attacks
Hezbollah's attacks in 1983 during the Lebanese Civil War are the first examples of the modern suicide terrorism. Workers Party of Kurdistan (PKK) used its first suicide attack in 1996, and al-Qaeda in the mid-1990s. The number of attacks using suicide tactics has grown from an average of fewer than five per year during the 1980s to 180 per year between 2000 and 2005, and from 81 suicide attacks in 2001 to 460 in 2005. These attacks have been aimed at diverse military and civilian targets, including in Sri Lanka, in Israel since July 6, 1989, in Iraq since the US-led invasion of that country in 2003, in Pakistan since 2001, in Afghanistan since 2005 and in Somalia since 2006.

Suicide bombings have also become a tactic in Chechnya, first being used in the conflict in 2000 in Alkhan Kala. A number of suicide attacks have also occurred in Russia as a result of the Chechen conflict, notably including the Moscow theater hostage crisis in 2002 to the Beslan school hostage crisis in 2004. The 2010 Moscow Metro bombings are also believed to result from the Chechen conflict . During the Sri Lankan Civil War, which raged on and off from 1983 to 2009, between the Sri Lankan government and the Liberation Tigers of Tamil Eelam (LTTE), The LTTE pioneered the use of suicide bombing and perfected it with the use of male/female suicide bombers both on and off battlefield; use of explosive-filled boats for suicide attacks on military shipping; use of light aircraft filled with explosives for targeting military installations.

See also 
 Improvised explosive device
 KIS (weapon)

References

External links 
 GunTech.com  page on Hillberg Insurgency Weapons, with pictures of Winchester Liberator and Colt Defender prototypes based on Hillberg patents.dead link
 Canada's National Firearms Association's page on the FP-45 Liberator and the CIA Deer Gun.
 Marstar Canada firearm's retailer's info page on Yugoslavian M-48BO "sanitized" rifle.
 Christian Science Monitor article On 2003 seizure that found a sanitized Sig Sauer pistol. (May 15, 2003 edition, author Warren Richey)
 Modern Firearms:  S-4M silent pistol

Insurgency weapons
Guerrilla warfare
Military tactics